Miguel Ángel is a Spanish masculine given name, a combination of the names Miguel and Ángel, often used in reference to the archangel Michael.

People
 Miguel Ángel Albizures, Guatelamalan human rights activist
 Miguel Ángel Álvarez, Puerto Rican comedian sopla poller
 Miguel Ángel Asturias, Guatemalan Nobel-prize winning writer and diplomat
 Miguel Ángel Benítez, Paraguayan retired footballer
 Miguel Ángel Blanco, Spanish politician
 Miguel Angel Dominguez, Paraguayan soccer player
 Miguel Ángel Estrella, Argentine pianist
 Miguel Angel Gamondi, Argentine football manager
 Miguel Ángel Guerra, Argentine racing driver
 Miguel Ángel Jiménez, Spanish golfer
 Miguel Ángel Loayza, Peruvian footballer
 Miguel Ángel Lozano, Spanish footballer
 Miguel Ángel Mancera, Mexican politician
 Miguel Ángel Nadal, Spanish footballer
 Miguel Ángel Oca, Spanish water polo player
 Miguel Ángel Osorio Chong, Mexican politician
 Miguel Angel Onzari, Argentine footballer
 Miguel Ángel Pichetto, Argentine politician
 Miguel Ángel Quevedo, Cuban journalist
 Miguel Ángel Raimondo, Argentine footballer
 Miguel Angel Reyes, American artist
 Miguel Ángel Rodríguez, Costa Rican politician
 Miguel Ángel Ruiz, Mexican author
 Miguel Ángel Silvestre, Spanish actor
 Miguel Ángel Yunes, Mexican politician

Spanish masculine given names